"We Can Do It" is the second single by Swedish singer and songwriter September from her debut studio album September. The song contains elements from "Take Your Time (Do It Right)" by American R&B group The S.O.S. Band, written by Sigidi and Harold Clayton. "We Can Do It" peaked at #10 on the Swedish singles chart. A new UK Radio Edit of the song was included on September's UK debut album, Cry for You – The Album, in 2009.

Track listing
CD single and digital download
 "We Can Do It" (Radio Version) – 3:38
 "We Can Do It" (Extended Version) – 5:17
 "We Can Do It" (Candido's Electro Short Cut) – 3:29
 "We Can Do It" (Candido's Electro 12" Cut) – 5:03

Charts

References

Petra Marklund songs
2003 singles
2003 songs
Songs written by Jonas von der Burg
Songs written by Anoo Bhagavan
Songs written by Niklas von der Burg
Stockholm Records singles